Donn Sléibhe Ua Gadhra, King of Sliabh Lugha, died 1181.

The Annals of Lough Ce appear to be the only contemporary reference to Donn Sléibhe, laconically reporting that Donnsleibhe O'Gadhra mortuus est in the year 1181.

External links

 http://www.ucc.ie/celt/published/T100010A/index.html

People from County Mayo
12th-century Irish monarchs